Papagoite is a rare cyclosilicate mineral. Chemically, it is a calcium copper aluminium silicate hydroxide, found as a secondary mineral on slip surfaces and in altered granodiorite veins, either in massive form or as microscopic crystals that may form spherical aggregates. Its chemical formula is Ca Cu Al Si2O6(O H)3.

It was discovered in 1960 in Ajo, Arizona, US, and was named after the Hia C-ed O'odham people (also known as the Sand Papago) who inhabit the area. This location is the only papagoite source within the United States, while worldwide it is also found in South Africa and Namibia. It is associated with aurichalcite, shattuckite, ajoite and baryte in Arizona, and with quartz, native copper and ajoite in South Africa. Its bright blue color is the mineral's most notable characteristic.

It is used as a gemstone.

References

Calcium minerals
Copper(II) minerals
Aluminium minerals
Cyclosilicates
Monoclinic minerals
Minerals in space group 12
Gemstones